Hercules Mulligan (September 25, 1740March 4, 1825) was an Irish-American tailor and spy during the American Revolutionary War. He was a member of the Sons of Liberty.

Early life
Born in Coleraine in the north of Ireland to Hugh and Sarah Mulligan, Hercules Mulligan immigrated with his family to North America in 1746, settling in New York City, where he was raised from the age of six. Mulligan attended King's College, now Columbia University, in New York City. After graduating, Mulligan worked as a clerk for his father's accounting business. He later went on to open a tailoring and haberdashery business, catering to wealthy officers of the British Crown forces.

On October 27, 1773, Mulligan married Elizabeth Sanders at Trinity Church, established by the Church of England. Sanders was the niece of Admiral Charles Sanders of the British Royal Navy. The couple had eight children: five daughters and three sons.

Mulligan was introduced to Alexander Hamilton shortly after Hamilton arrived in New York by Mulligan's brother, Hugh, and took him on as a lodger. Mulligan also knew the Crugers, Hamilton's patrons for whom he had clerked in St. Croix, and helped Hamilton sell their cargo that was to be used for his education and upkeep. Mulligan helped Hamilton enroll at the Elizabethtown Academy grammar school in New Jersey to prepare for the College of New Jersey (now Princeton University), where he placed Hamilton under the wing of William Livingston, a prominent local American revolutionary, with whom Hamilton lived for a while.  Hamilton eventually enrolled at King's College instead, Mulligan's alma mater in New York City. Mulligan had a profound impact on Hamilton's desire for revolution.

Involvement in the American Revolution
In 1765, Mulligan became one of the first colonists to join the Sons of Liberty, a secret society formed to protect the rights of the colonists and to oppose British policies that limited them. In 1770, he clashed with British soldiers in the Battle of Golden Hill. He was a member of the New York Committee of Correspondence, a group that rallied opposition to the British and coordinated with groups in other colonies through written communications. In August 1775 while under fire from HMS Asia, he and a New York volunteer militia company called the Corsicans, captured four British cannons in the Battery. In 1776, Mulligan and the Sons of Liberty knocked down a statue of King George III in Bowling Green and then melted the lead to cast bullets to use against the British. Mulligan remained in New York as a civilian unexposed after Washington's army was driven out during the New York campaign in summer 1776.

While staying with the Mulligan family, Alexander Hamilton came to share Mulligan's views.  As a result, Hamilton wrote an essay in 1775 in favor of independence.  When George Washington spoke of his need for reliable information from within New York City in 1776, after the Continental Army was driven out, Hamilton (who was then an officer on Washington's staff) recommended Mulligan due to his placement as tailor to British soldiers and officers.

This proved to be incredibly successful, with Mulligan saving Washington's life on two occasions. The first occurred when a British officer, who requested a watch coat late one evening, told Mulligan of their plans: "Before another day, we'll have the rebel general in our hands." Mulligan quickly informed Washington, who changed his plans and avoided capture.

Mulligan's slave, Cato, was a Black Patriot who served as a spy together with Mulligan, and often acted the role of courier, in part through British-held territory, by exploiting his status as a slave, letting him pass on intelligence to the Continental Army without being detained. In 1778, Cato was granted his freedom in return for his service during the war. He was discharged in 1783 and moved to Plymouth, Massachusetts.

After the Revolutionary War
Mulligan was cleared of suspicions of possible Loyalist sympathies after the British evacuated New York City and General Washington entered it at the end of the war, when Washington had breakfast with him on the day after.

On January 25, 1785, Mulligan, Alexander Hamilton, and John Jay became three of the 19 founders of the New York Manumission Society, an early American organization founded to promote the abolition of slavery. 
 
Following the Revolution, Mulligan's tailoring business prospered. He retired in 1820 and died in 1825, aged 84. Mulligan was buried in the Sanders tomb behind Trinity Church. When the church was enlarged, the Sanders tomb was covered. Today, there is a grave stone located in the southwest quadrant of the churchyard bearing Mulligan's name.

In popular culture 
The Culper Ring is depicted in the fictionalized AMC American Revolutionary War spy thriller period drama series, Turn: Washington's Spies, based on Alexander Rose's historical book Washington's Spies: The Story of America's First Spy Ring (2007). Mulligan and Cato are portrayed in the fourth and final season.

In the 2015 hit Broadway musical Hamilton and its 2020 film release, Mulligan was portrayed by actor Okieriete Onaodowan, who also played James Madison. Mulligan appears in the first act of the play as a friend of Alexander Hamilton, John Laurens, and Marquis de Lafayette, working as a tailor's apprentice and subsequently a soldier and spy in the American Revolution.

See also
 Intelligence in the American Revolutionary War
 Intelligence operations in the American Revolutionary War
 Culper Ring

References

1740 births
1825 deaths
American tailors
Columbia College (New York) alumni
Businesspeople from New York City
Kingdom of Ireland emigrants to the Thirteen Colonies
American spies during the American Revolution
American slave owners
Members of the New York Manumission Society
18th-century American businesspeople
19th-century American Episcopalians